Todd Mackenzie Allen (born 1970) is a Canadian-born immunologist and virologist at the Ragon Institute of MGH, MIT and Harvard, and a Professor of Medicine at Harvard University. He is a specialist in HIV vaccine design and the sequence evolution and diversity of HIV and hepatitis C virus (HCV). More recently, his work is focused on developing novel immunotherapeutic approaches towards a functional cure of HIV, including chimeric antigen receptor (CAR) T cell immunotherapy and gene editing approaches capable of protecting against HIV infection.

Early life and education

Allen, the son of American parents, was born in St. Catharines, Ontario, Canada. He received his bachelor of science (BSc) in Biochemistry at the University of Waterloo before completing his PhD degree in Cellular and Molecular Biology at the University of Wisconsin – Madison studying T cell responses in the SIV infected macaque model of HIV infection. In 2001, he moved to Boston to join the Partners AIDS Research Center (now the Ragon Institute of MGH, MIT and Harvard).

Research and career

In 2014, he was promoted to Professor of Medicine at Harvard Medical School (HMS). His laboratory at the Ragon Institute is focused on identifying protective immunity to HIV and Hepatitis C virus (HCV). He is a faculty member of the Harvard Virology PhD program and in 2013 was awarded the Massachusetts General Hospital Research Scholars Award, providing philanthropic support for his research program. He has published over 180 peer-reviewed papers on HIV and HCV. His recent work uses humanized mouse models to accelerate development and testing of novel immunotherapies for HIV, including most recently the design of a novel Dual CAR T cell capable of controlling HIV

Selected publications

 Allen, TM, O’Connor, DH, Mothé, BR, Vogel, TU, Liebl, ME, Jing, P, Dzuris, JL, Emerson, C, Kunstman, KJ, Wang, X, Desrosiers, RC, Altman, JD, Wolinsky, SM, Sette, A, and Watkins, DI.  Tat-specific cytotoxic T lymphocytes select for SIV escape variants during resolution of primary viraemia. Nature  2000 407(6802):386-390. DOI:10.1038/35030124. . According to Google Scholar, it has been cited 854 times.
 O’Connor, DH, Allen, TM, Vogel, TU, Jing, P, DeSouza, I, Dunphy, E, Melsaether, C, Dodds, E, Mothe, B, Horton, H, and Watkins, DI.  Acute phase cytotoxic T lymphocyte escape is a hallmark of simian immunodeficiency virus infection. Nature Medicine  2002 May;8(5) 493-499.  DOI: 10.1038/nm0502-493. . . According to Google Scholar, it has been cited 435 times.
 Dudek TE, No DC, Seung E, Vrbanac VD, Fadda L, Bhoumik P, Boutwell CL, Power KA, Gladden AD, Battis L, Mellors EF, Tivey TR, Gao X, Altfeld M, Luster AD, Tager AM, and Allen TM.  Rapid evolution of HIV-1 to functional CD8⁺ T cell responses in humanized BLT mice. Science Translational Medicine. 2012 Jul 18;4(143):143ra98. DOI: 10.1126/scitranslmed.3003984. PMC3685142.
 Henn MR, Boutwell CL, Charlebois P, Lennon NJ, Power KA, Macalalad AR, Berlin AM, Malboeuf CM, Ryan EM, Gnerre S, Zody MC, Erlich RL, Green LM, Berical A, Wang Y, Casali M, Streeck H,  Bloom AK, Dudek T, Tully D, Newman R, Axten KL, Gladden AD, Battis L, Kemper M, Zeng Q, Shea TP, Gujja S, Zedlack C, Gasser O, Brander C, Hess C, Günthard HF, Brumme ZL, Brumme CJ, Bazner S, Rychert J, Tinsley JP, Mayer KH, Rosenberg E, Pereyra F, Levin JZ, Young SK, Jessen H, Altfeld M, Birren BW, Walker BD, Allen TM.  Whole genome deep sequencing of HIV-1 reveals the impact of early minor variants upon immune recognition during acute infection. PLoS Pathogens 2012 8(3):e1002529. DOI: 10.1371/journal.ppat.1002529. PMCID: PMC3297584. According to Google Scholar, it has been cited 340 times.
 Maldini CR, Claiborne DT, Okawa K, Chen T, Dopkin DL, Shan X, Power KA, Trifonova RT, Krupp K, Phelps M, Vrbanac VD, Tanno S, Bateson T, Leslie GJ, Hoxie JA, Boutwell CL, Riley JL, Allen TM. Dual CD4-based CAR T Cells with Distinct Costimulatory Domains Mitigate HIV Pathogenesis In Vivo. Nature Medicine 2020. DOI:https://doi.org/10.1038/s41591-020-1039-5

References

External links 
 Ragon Institute of MGH, MIT and Harvard
 Harvard Virology Profile
 Google Scholar

1970 births
Living people
Canadian immunologists
Canadian virologists
University of Waterloo alumni
University of Wisconsin–Madison College of Letters and Science alumni
Harvard Medical School faculty